Bernard Bennett (31 August 1931 – 12 January 2002) was an English former professional player of snooker and English billiards, whose career spanned twenty-six years between 1969 and 1995.

Bennett was a stalwart of professional snooker and billiards throughout the 1970s and 1980s, but his success, especially at the former, was limited. He entered every World Snooker Championship from 1969 to 1995, with the exception of the November 1970 Championship, which was held in Australia, and that of 1993. Aside from his playing career, Bennett played an important but largely-overlooked role in the development of snooker and billiards during the 1970s and early 1980s. He was known more as an organiser, supporter and promoter of both games than as a player.

Playing career
Bennett was born in Kingston-upon-Thames, Surrey and was introduced to snooker by his elder brother John. Bennett worked as a carpenter and in 1965 moved to Southampton where he set up in the building trade.

Bennett turned professional in 1969, without any significant amateur record. By entering the 1969 World Snooker Championship, and paying the almost prohibitive £100 entrance fee, Bennett enabled a straight knockout tournament to be held, although he was heavily defeated in the first round 4–25 by Rex Williams. He competed in the 1970 event but was defeated in the first round 8–11 by David Taylor. In 1972, he lost 15–6 to Graham Miles in the first round of qualifying and 9–8 to David Greaves in his 1973 opening match.

In the 1974 World Championship, he defeated 1970 finalist Warren Simpson 8–2, to record his first significant professional win, but Simpson was affected by ill health, having discharged himself from hospital to play in the tournament. Simpson's energy left him and Bennett won the last five frames in a row. Bennett was unable to contain Alex Higgins in the second round, and lost 15–4. The victory was sufficient to place Bennett in 18th place when professional rankings were first introduced in time for the 1976–77 season.

At the inaugural UK Championship in 1977, Bennett performed well against Willie Thorne and was only narrowly defeated 5–4.

During the qualifying competition for the 1978 World Championship, Bennett drew Maurice Parkin, a player who, like himself, had won only one match in the event since his first entry. In a clear indication of snooker's rising popularity at this time, over 200 people travelled to Romiley Forum on Easter Monday to watch their match. The affair was a low-scoring one, producing only three breaks over 20 in the first eight frames. Eventually, Parkin pulled away from 5–4 to win 9–4, with a top break in the match of only 29, bettered by Bennett's 31 in frame nine.

In April 1979, at the World Championship, Bennett drew Terry Griffiths, in the first round of qualifying. Bennett won the first two frames but lost nine frames in a row to lose 9–2. Griffiths went on to win the tournament, becoming World Champion at his first attempt.

Bennett played more through his love of the game than for any financial gain, which he showed by continuing to play despite a 10–0 defeat by Sakchai Sim Ngam in the 1986 World Championship and another whitewash by the same scoreline by Billy Kelly in the 1987 World Championship qualifying first round. Following this latter defeat, Bennett slipped to 124th in the world rankings, meaning that he was among the first group of professional players to lose full tournament playing rights.

Able only to enter the World Championship, Bennett played in the 1988 event, losing 10–5 to Jim Meadowcroft, after the first six frames had been shared. However, in the 1989 event, after a gap of 15 years, Bennett won his second world championship match in defeating Clive Everton 10–4. He also led veteran Fred Davis 3–1 in the second round of qualifying, but lost the match 10–4. In the 1990 event, Bennett led Andrew Cairns 4–3 in the first qualifying round, but made no further progress in losing the match 10–4.

1991 was no more successful for Bennett, as he lost 2–10 to Jason Whittaker in his first match, and he was whitewashed once more in 1992 - this time beaten 0–10 by the young Anthony Hamilton. He did not enter the 1993 edition, but was again beaten without winning a frame in 1994, losing to Andrew Atkinson 0–5. His final attempt at qualifying, in 1995, ended in identical fashion, the 63-year-old Bennett being beaten 0–5 by Alfie Burden. Bennett died, a figure of unanimous affection throughout the sport of snooker, in January 2002, at the age of 70.

Other roles
Bennett was the owner of the Castle Club in Southampton, which was one of the first modern snooker centres. From here, he organised many pro-am events in both snooker and billiards, also hosting the Castle Professional a mini snooker 'triangular' event featuring three professionals. The Castle Pro-Am event (which Bennett financially supported) was a popular addition to the snooker scene, and was usually held in December of every year. Bennett, who had accrued his money from the building trade, went on to own other snooker clubs in the Southampton area.

The Castle Pro-Am event proved beneficial to a number of professional players; at the end of the 1975/76 season, Alex Higgins, who was placed second on that season's Order of Merit, had earned only £2,250 from the three main events of the season, but won £500 as the victor of the 1975 edition alone.

Bennett played better snooker when closer to his home in Southampton, and in the 1977/78 season, he defeated both John Pulman 3–0 and Doug Mountjoy 5–2 in that season's Castle Pro-Am tournament.

Bennett was a founding member of the Professional Billiards Players' Association when it was reformed in 1969, and, in addition to being a player, was a well-respected administrator and coach for many years. Bennett's efforts led to the resurrection of the World Professional Billiards Championship in 1971, after a hiatus of three years. Bennett provided both the financial guarantee, the venue for the event, and the opposition, but was heavily defeated by defending champion Rex Williams 9,250-4,058.

Performance and rankings timeline

References

External links

English snooker players
English players of English billiards
Coaches, managers and promoters in English billiards
Snooker coaches, managers and promoters
1931 births
2002 deaths
People from Kingston upon Thames
Sportspeople from Southampton
Sportspeople from Surrey